was a Japanese film director who directed such pinku eiga films as  and . He also produced Nagisa Ōshima's controversial film In the Realm of the Senses (1976). He has been called "the most important director to emerge in the pink film genre," and one of "Japan's leading directors of the 1960s."

His 2010 film, Caterpillar, was nominated for the Golden Bear at the 60th Berlin International Film Festival.

Early life
Kōji Wakamatsu was born in Wakuya, Miyagi, Japan on 1 April 1936, from a poor family of rice farmers. Wakamatsu worked in several menial jobs, namely as a construction worker, before becoming a yakuza, as "a member of the Yasuma-gumi clan in the Shinjuku ward of Tokyo". After his criminal experience, he unsuccessfully enrolled in television before beginning his film career with Nikkatsu in 1963.

Career 
Between 1963 and 1965, he directed 20 exploitation films for the studio, based on sensational topics of the day. He became interested in the Pink Film genre after the success of Tetsuji Takechi's 1964 Daydream. Nikkatsu submitted his  (also known as Secrets Behind the Wall) (1965) to the 15th Berlin International Film Festival while the film was still under review by Eirin, the Japanese film-rating board. This submission before passing Eirin's review was doubly embarrassing for the government since pink films, though already emerging as the dominant domestic cinematic genre, were not regarded as worthy of critical attention or international export.  The film received an enthusiastic reception at the festival, but Nikkatsu, fearful of governmental retaliatory action, gave it a low-profile domestic release. Disappointed, Wakamatsu quit the studio to form his own company.

Wakamatsu's independent films of the late 1960s were very low-budget, but often artistically done works, usually concerned with sex and extreme violence mixed with political messages. Some critics have suggested that these films were an intentional provocation to the government, in order to generate free publicity resulting from censorship controversies. His films were usually produced for less than 1,000,000 yen (about $5,000), necessitating extreme cost-cutting measures including location shooting, single-takes, and natural lighting. His early films were usually in black and white with occasional bursts of color for theatrical effect.

Freeze-frames, flash-backs, hand-held camera and locations limited to two rooms and a hallway add to the film's disturbing, claustrophobic atmosphere.  was a parody of Imamura's A Man Vanishes (1967). In Wakamatsu's film, a man leaves his family in Tokyo to travel and engage in various sexual escapades. When he returns home he finds out that his wife is starring in Imamura's documentary about her search for her missing husband.

 was based on the murder of eight nursing students in the U.S. by Richard Speck.  was based on a serial rapist case in Japan after World War II.  is loosely based on the Tate-LaBianca murders by the Manson Family in the same year. With , he tried "to show how the revolutionary movements are always infiltrated by the moles working for the government".

 was based on the "Asama-Sansō incident". Long and harsh, this movie includes a long documentary part about the political background that led to this tragedy and the self-destruction of the Japanese radical left.

While directing many successful and critically praised Pink Films, Wakamatsu also became known for giving young filmmakers their first experience in working in the industry. Among those whose early careers were helped by Wakamatsu are Banmei Takahashi, Genji Nakamura and Kan Mukai.

His 2010 film, Caterpillar, competed for the Golden Bear at the 60th Berlin International Film Festival.

In 2011, a new film on the last days of acclaimed novelist and political activist Yukio Mishima, focusing on the stream of events leading to the so-called Ichigaya incident of November 25, 1970, was announced as being on its stage of full completion. The film entitled 11.25 Jiketsu No Hi, Mishima Yukio To Wakamonotachi [11.25自決の日、三島由紀夫と若者たち] features Japanese actor Arata as Mishima. The film competed in the Un Certain Regard section at the 2012 Cannes Film Festival.

Death
Wakamatsu died on 17 October 2012 after being hit by a taxi cab in Tokyo on 12 October on his way home after a budget meeting to discuss his next project, a movie about the Japanese nuclear lobby and Tepco.

Partial filmography

References

Sources
 
 
 
 
 
 Sedia Giuseppe Interview with Kōji Wakamatsu  at Asia Express, (Italian), September 2007.
 
 
 
 
 
 Crispim, Pedro (2022). "Kōji Wakamatsu: Alienation and the Womb", in Disegno V1/01_ Total Cinema: Film and Design.

External links
 
 Eigagogo.free.fr
 
 El cine de Koji Wakamatsu (Revista digital "Japan Next") - Español
 El cine de Koji Wakamatsu (Wasabi Magazine - Español)
 News of his death in Japanese
 News of his death in English

1936 births
2012 deaths
Japanese film directors
Pink film directors
People from Miyagi Prefecture
Road incident deaths in Japan